The 1989 NCAA Division I women's soccer tournament was the eighth annual single-elimination tournament to determine the national champion of NCAA Division I women's collegiate soccer. The championship game was played again at Method Road Soccer Stadium in Raleigh, North Carolina during December 1989.

North Carolina defeated Colorado College in the final, 2–0, to win their seventh national title. Coached by Anson Dorrance, the Tar Heels finished the season 24–0–1. This was the fourth of North Carolina's record nine consecutive national titles (1986–1994). It was also part of the Tar Heels' ten-year unbeaten streak that ran from the 1984 championship game all the way until the 1994 season.

The most outstanding offensive player was Kristine Lilly from North Carolina, and the most outstanding defensive player was Tracey Bates, also from North Carolina. Shannon Higgins, also from North Carolina, was the tournament's leading scorer (3 goals, 4 assists).

Qualification

After the establishment of the NCAA Division II Women's Soccer Championship in 1988, only Division I women's soccer programs were eligible to qualify for the tournament. Nonetheless, the tournament field remained fixed at 12 teams.

Bracket

See also 
 NCAA Division I women's soccer championship
 NCAA Division II Women's Soccer Championship
 NCAA Division III Women's Soccer Championship
 1989 NCAA Division I Men's Soccer Championship

References

NCAA
NCAA Women's Soccer Championship
 
NCAA Division I Women's Soccer Tournament
NCAA Division I Women's Soccer Tournament